Venko (Esperanto for victory) is a male Slavic given name. Notable people with the name include:
Venko Aleksandrov (born 1944), Bulgarian academic, medical doctor and politician
Venko Andonovski (born 1964), Macedonian writer, essayist, critic and literary theorist
Venko Filipče (born 1977), Macedonian neurosurgeon and former Health Minister
Venko Markovski (1915–1988), Bulgarian-Macedonian writer, poet, partisan and Communist politician

Masculine given names
Slavic masculine given names